Beechland Beach is a neighborhood of Louisville, Kentucky located on the Ohio River at Beechland Beach Road.

References

Neighborhoods in Louisville, Kentucky